In geometry, the Hanan grid  of a finite set  of points in the plane is obtained by constructing vertical and horizontal lines through each point in .

It is named after Maurice Hanan, who was first to investigate the rectilinear Steiner minimum tree and introduced this graph.

References 

Graph families
Geometric graphs